The Sunbeam Cossack was a British 12-cylinder aero engine that was first run in 1916. The Cossack spawned a family of engines from Sunbeam.

Design and development
As the First World War raged through 1914 and 1915, The Admiralty demanded engines with more power for its existing and future aircraft. The problem was exemplified by the Short Type 184 seaplanes of the RNAS, powered by Sunbeam Mohawk engines, which could barely lift the standard air-dropped torpedo with crew reduced to two and minimal fuel. An engine with a base rating of at least  was demanded by the Admiralty. Responses came from Rolls-Royce with the Rolls-Royce Eagle and Sunbeam with the Sunbeam Cossack.

Construction of the Cossack was largely of aluminium alloy with cast-iron cylinder blocks and integral heads in groups of three.

Large orders were placed for the Cossack but deliveries were very slow, with only eleven, largely hand-built, engines delivered from March 1916 to September 1916. The end of Sunbeam Gurkha production in October 1916 freed up factory resources to allow up to thirty engines a month to be delivered until Cossack production ended in December 1917 after 350 deliveries.

Late in the First World War Britain's airship aspirations were boosted by the order for the R36, R37 and R38. All three airships were powered a variety of engines including the  Sunbeam Cossack III a derivative of the Cossack with a flywheel, hand or air starter, engine controls and magnetos mounted directly on the engine for access by the engine mechanics. The Cossack 3 was designed with a water-cooled exhaust and speed governor. The overhead camshaft was gear driven from the crankshaft. Only 14 Cossack IIIs were built due to the cancellation of the post-war British airships.

Amazon
In similar fashion to other engine families designed by Coatalen the Cossack spawned a straight-six derivative in the Amazon, in effect half a Cossack, retaining the 110 x 160mm bore/stroke, overhead camshaft, four poppet valves per cylinder and cast-iron cylinder blocks in groups of three. Despite the high output the Amazon was little used in Britain, with only possible use aboard Coastal airships and some supplied to the Imperial Russian Air Service. Amazon production totalled 77 out of an order for 100, 23 of which were cancelled. A non-aviation use version of the Amazon was produced as the Sunbeam Amazon II, fitted with hand and/or compressed-air starters and single magneto ignition system.

Saracen
Development paths favoured by Coatalen included increasing the bore and Aluminium alloy cylinder blocks. Delivering  at 2,000 rpm, driving a propeller through a 2:1 reduction gear. When submitted to the Internal Combustion Engine Committee of the National Advisory Committee for Aeronautics the Saracen faced stiff competition from the Beardmore 160 hp and Hispano-Suiza 8 and did not attract any orders. Only prototypes of the Saracen were built.

Viking
To extract more power from the Cossack lineage Coatalen designed a W-18 version known as the Sunbeam Viking. This engine used Cossack blocks in a W arrangement with 60° between banks having a capacity of  giving  at a propeller speed of 900 rpm. Orders for 50 engines were received, intended to power the large AD Seaplane Type 1000 aircraft, but most of the nine engines produced were fitted to motor boats, the remaining 41 being cancelled.

Matabele
Developed in two versions, the Sunbeam Matabele I, for aviation use, was fitted with four magnetos to provide redundancy for the dual ignition system, whilst the Sunbeam Matabele II was only fitted with two magnetos supplying a single ignition system for non-aviation use. Used mainly in Airco DH.4 bombers, the Matabele also found favour as a power-boat and speed-record car engine. No Matabeles were built during the First World War, but prototypes and at least eight production engines were built after the war for various applications.

Sunbeam 1000 hp

The Matabele engine is best known today for powering the Sunbeam 1000 hp land speed record car, the first car to exceed 200 mph.

The S.T.D. Motors team was short of funds and so little new development was possible.

A pair of Matabele engines were found in the Sunbeam works at Wolverhampton, previously from the ill-fated Maple Leaf VII powerboat. As the Sunbeam 1000 HP is reported as having 4 magnetos per engine, these would appear to be Matabele I, rather than Matabele II engines.

On 29 March 1927, the Sunbeam became the first car to exceed 200 mph. Although loudly trumpeted as the "1000 HP" Sunbeam, the actual power was somewhere around 900 bhp.

The installation of these engines was somewhat unorthodox, necessitated by the limited funds for new work. The rear engine was started first by compressed air starting, then the front engine was started through a mechanical friction clutch. Once synchronised, they were locked together with a dog clutch for the record attempt. The car's last run was a demonstration circuit at Brooklands, running at slow speed on only one engine, with this dog clutch disconnected.

Variants
Cossack I
The basic production V-12 engine with cast-iron blocks,  bore and single ignition system fed by two magnetos.
Cossack II
An improved Cossack with dual ignition system and hand / compressed air starter.
Cossack 3
Built for airship use. Produced 350 hp at 2,000 rpm and weighed  dry.
Amazon
A straight six version of the Cossack retaining the dual ignition system, bore and stroke and cast-iron blocks in groups of three.
Amazon II
A non-aviation use version of the Amazon with single ignition system.
Saracen
Viking
The Viking was a W-18 using the blocks of the Cossack and retaining its attributes. Intended for the AD.1000 floatplane for the RNAS. Production of the 50 ordered was halted after nine had been built; those not used in the sole AD.1000 built were fitted to motor-boats.
Matabele I
Intended for general aviation use the Matabele I had a dual ignition system with four magnetos.
Matabele II
For non-aviation use the Matabele II had a single ignition system and compressed-air / hand starters. This engine found favour powering motor-boats.

Applications
 AD Seaplane Type 1000 (Cossack and Viking)
 Short Type 310 (Cossack)
 Porte Baby FB.2 (Cossack)
 Felixstowe F.3 (Cossack)
 Handley Page Type O/400 (Cossack)
 Tellier Flying boat (Cossack)
 HM Airship R36 (Cossack III)
 HM Airship R37 (Cossack III) Airship scrapped when 95% complete
 HM Airship R38 (Cossack III) (R38 class discontinued)
 Coastal class blimp C-14 (Amazon?)
 Thorneycroft Coastal motor-boats (Viking)
 Airco DH.4 (Matabele II)
 Sunbeam Despujois I – motor boat (Matabele II)
 Sunbeam Despujois II – motor boat (Matabele II)
 Sunbeam Despujois IV – motor boat (Matabele II)
 Sunbeam Despujois V – motor boat (Matabele II)
 Maple Leaf VII – Sir Edward Mackay Edgar's 1921 Saunders- built motor boat (Matabele II)
 Sunbeam 1000 hp – speed record breaking car (Matabele I)

Specifications (Cossack II)

See also

References

Bibliography
 
 Lumsden, Alec. British Piston Engines and their Aircraft. Marlborough, Wiltshire: Airlife Publishing, 2003. .
 Brew, Alec. Sunbeam Aero-Engines. Airlife Publishing. Shrewsbury.

External links

Sunbeam Overhead Cam Engines

Cossack
1910s aircraft piston engines